The FIFA Club World Cup is an international men's association football competition organised by the Fédération Internationale de Football Association (FIFA), the sport's global governing body. The competition was first contested in 2000 as the FIFA Club World Championship. It was not held from 2001 to 2004 due to a combination of factors in the cancelled 2001 tournament, most importantly the collapse of FIFA's marketing partner International Sport and Leisure (ISL), but since 2005 it has been held every year, and has been hosted by Brazil, Japan, the United Arab Emirates, Morocco and Qatar. Views differ as to the cup's prestige: it struggles to attract interest in most of Europe, and is the object of heated debate in South America.

The first FIFA Club World Championship took place in Brazil in 2000, during which year it ran in parallel with the Intercontinental Cup, a competition played by the winners of the UEFA Champions League and the Copa Libertadores, with the champions of each tournament both recognised (in 2017) by FIFA as club world champions. In 2005, the Intercontinental Cup was merged with the FIFA Club World Championship, and in 2006, the tournament was renamed as the FIFA Club World Cup. The winner of the Club World Cup receives the FIFA Club World Cup trophy and a FIFA World Champions certificate.

The current format of the tournament involves seven teams competing for the title at venues within the host nation over a period of about two weeks; the winners of that year's AFC Champions League (Asia), CAF Champions League (Africa), CONCACAF Champions League (North, Central America and Caribbean), CONMEBOL Libertadores (South America), OFC Champions League (Oceania) and UEFA Champions League (Europe), along with the host nation's national champions, participate in a straight knock-out tournament. The host nation's national champions contest a play-off against the Oceania champions, from which the winner joins the champions of Asia, Africa and North America in the quarter-finals. The quarter-final winners go on to face the European and South American champions, who enter at the semi-final stage, for a place in the final.

Real Madrid hold the record for most titles, having won the competition on five occasions. Corinthians' inaugural victory remains the best result from a host nation's national league champions. Teams from Spain have won the tournament eight times, the most for any nation. The current world champions are Real Madrid, who defeated Al-Hilal 5–3 in the 2022 final.

History

Origin

The first club tournament to be billed as the Football World Championship was held in 1887, in which FA Cup winners Aston Villa beat Scottish Cup winners Hibernian, the winners of the only national competitions at the time. The first time when the champions of two European leagues met was in what was nicknamed the 1895 World Championship, when English champions Sunderland beat Scottish champions Heart of Midlothian 5–3. Ironically, the Sunderland lineup in the 1895 World Championship consisted entirely of Scottish players – Scottish players who moved to England to play professionally in those days were known as the Scotch Professors.

The first attempt at creating a global club football tournament, according to FIFA, was in 1909, 21 years before the first FIFA World Cup. The Sir Thomas Lipton Trophy was held in Italy in 1909 and 1911, and contested by English, Italian, German and Swiss clubs. English amateur team West Auckland won on both occasions. The idea that FIFA should organise international club competitions dates from the beginning of the 1950s. In 1951, FIFA President Jules Rimet was asked about FIFA's involvement in Copa Rio, the competition created by the Brazilian FA with a view to being a Club World Cup (a "club version" of the FIFA World Cup), and Rimet stated that it was not under FIFA's jurisdiction since it was organised and sponsored by the Brazilian FA. FIFA board officials Stanley Rous and Ottorino Barassi participated personally, albeit not as FIFA assignees, in the organisation of Copa Rio in 1951. Brazilian side Palmeiras beat Italian side Juventus in Maracanã Stadium with over 200 thousand spectators, being considered by many the first Club World Cup Champion. Rous' role was the negotiations with European clubs, whereas Barassi did the same and also helped form the framework of the competition. The Italian press regarded the competition as an "impressive project" that "was greeted so enthusiastically by FIFA officials Stanley Rous and Jules Rimet to the extent of almost giving it an official FIFA stamp." Because of the difficulty the Brazilian FA found in bringing European clubs to the competition, the O Estado de S. Paulo newspaper suggested that there should be FIFA involvement in the programming of international club competitions saying that, "ideally, international tournaments, here or abroad, should be played with a schedule set by FIFA". Still in the 1950s, the Pequeña Copa del Mundo (Spanish for Small World Cup) was a tournament held in Venezuela between 1952 and 1957, with some other club tournaments held in Caracas from 1958 onwards also often referred to by the name of the original 1952–1957 tournament. It was usually played by four participants, half from Europe and half from South America.

Obstacles to creation

The Tournoi de Paris was a competition initially meant to bring together the top teams from Europe and South America; it was first played in 1957 when Vasco da Gama, the Rio de Janeiro champions, beat European champions Real Madrid 4–3 in the final at the Parc des Princes. The victory was hailed in France and Brazil as a "best of Europe X best of South American" club match as it was Real Madrid's first intercontinental competition as European champions (the Madrid team played the 1956 Pequeña Copa del Mundo, but confirmed their participation in the Venezuelan tournament before becoming European champions). In 1958, Real Madrid declined to participate in the Paris competition claiming that the final of the 1957/58 European Cup was just 5 days after the Paris Tournoi. On October 8, 1958, the Brazilian FA President João Havelange announced, at a UEFA meeting he attended as an invitee, the decision to create the Copa Libertadores and the Intercontinental Cup, the latter being a UEFA/CONMEBOL-endorsed "best club of the world" contest between the champion clubs of both confederations.

Real Madrid won the first Intercontinental Cup in 1960, and titled themselves world champions until FIFA stepped in and objected, citing that the competition did not include any other champions from the other confederations; FIFA stated that they can only claim to be intercontinental champions of a competition played between two continental organisations in which no other continents had the opportunity to participate. FIFA stated that they would prohibit the 1961 edition to be played out unless the organisers regarded the competition as a friendly or a private match between two organisations. The same year the Intercontinental Cup was first played, 1960, FIFA authorised the International Soccer League, created (along the lines of the 1950s Copa Rio) with a view to creating a Club World Cup, with ratification from Sir Stanley Rous, who then had become FIFA President.

The Intercontinental Cup attracted the interest of other continents. The North and Central America confederation, CONCACAF, was created in 1961 in order to, among other reasons, try to include its clubs in the Copa Libertadores and, by extension, the Intercontinental Cup. However, their entry into both competitions was rejected. Subsequently, the CONCACAF Champions' Cup began in 1962.

Due to the brutality of the Argentine and Uruguayan clubs at the Intercontinental Cup, FIFA was asked several times during the late 1960s to assess penalties and regulate the tournament. However, FIFA refused each request. The first of these requests was made in 1967, after a play-off match labelled The Battle of Montevideo. The Scottish Football Association, via President Willie Allan, wanted FIFA to recognise the competition in order to enforce football regulation; FIFA responded that it could not regulate a competition it did not organise. Allan's crusade also suffered after CONMEBOL, with the backing of its President Teofilo Salinas and the Argentine Football Association (Asociación del Fútbol Argentino; AFA), refused to allow FIFA to have any hand in the competition stating:

René Courte, FIFA's General Sub-Secretary, wrote in 1967 an article shortly afterwards stating that FIFA viewed the Intercontinental Cup as a "European-South American friendly match". This was confirmed by FIFA President Sir Stanley Rous. With the Asian and North American club competitions in place in 1967, FIFA opened the idea of supervising the Intercontinental Cup if it included those confederations, with Stanley Rous saying that CONCACAF and the Asian Football Confederation had requested in 1967 participation of their champions in the Intercontinental Cup; the proposal was met with a negative response from UEFA and CONMEBOL. The 1968 and 1969 Intercontinental Cups finished in similarly violent fashion, with Manchester United manager Matt Busby insisting that "the Argentineans should be banned from all competitive football. FIFA should really step in." In 1970, the FIFA Executive Committee proposed the creation of a multicontinental Club World Cup, not limited to Europe and South America but including also the other confederations; the idea did not go forward due to UEFA resistance.

In 1973, French newspaper L'Equipe, who helped bring about the birth of the European Cup, volunteered to sponsor a Club World Cup contested by the champions of Europe, South America, North America and Africa, the only continental club tournaments in existence at the time; the competition was to potentially take place in Paris between September and October 1974, with an eventual final to be held at the Parc des Princes. The extreme negativity of the Europeans prevented this from happening. The same newspaper tried once again in 1975 to create a Club World Cup, in which participants would have been the four semi-finalists of the European Cup, both finalists of the Copa Libertadores, as well as the African and Asian champions; once more, the proposal was to no avail. UEFA, via its president, Artemio Franchi, declined once again and the proposal failed. The idea for a multicontinental, FIFA-endorsed Club World Cup was also endorsed by João Havelange in his campaigning for FIFA presidency in 1974. The Mexican clubs América and Pumas UNAM, and the Mexican Football Association, demanded participation in the Intercontinental Cup (either as the American-continent representantives in the Intercontinental Cup or as part of a UEFA-CONMEBOL-CONCACAF new Intercontinental Cup) after winning the 1977/1978 and 1980/1981 editions of the Interamerican Cup against the South American champions; the request was unsuccessful.

With the Intercontinental Cup in danger of being dissolved, West Nally, a British marketing company, was hired by UEFA and CONMEBOL to find a viable solution in 1980; Toyota Motor Corporation, via West Nally, took the competition under its wing and rebranded it as the Toyota Cup, a one-off match played in Japan. Toyota invested over US$700,000 in the 1980 edition to take place in Tokyo's National Olympic Stadium, with over US$200,000 awarded to each participant. The Toyota Cup, with its new format, was received with scepticism, as the sport was unfamiliar in the Far East. However, the financial incentive was welcomed, as European and South American clubs were suffering financial difficulties. To protect themselves against the possibility of European withdrawals, Toyota, UEFA and every European Cup participant signed annual contracts requiring the eventual winners of the European Cup to participate at the Intercontinental Cup, as a condition UEFA stipulated to the clubs' participation in the European Cup, or risk facing an international lawsuit from UEFA and Toyota. In 1983, the English Football Association tried organising a Club World Cup to be played in 1985 and sponsored by West Nally, only to be denied by UEFA.

Inauguration (2000–2001)

The framework of the 2000 FIFA Club World Championship was laid years in advance. According to Sepp Blatter, the idea of the tournament was presented to the executive committee in December 1993 in Las Vegas, United States by Silvio Berlusconi, AC Milan's president. Since every confederation had, by then, a stable, continental championship, FIFA felt it was prudent and relevant to have a Club World Championship tournament. Initially, there were nine candidates to host the competition: China, Brazil, Mexico, Paraguay, Saudi Arabia, Tahiti, Turkey, the United States and Uruguay; of the nine, only Saudi Arabia, Mexico, Brazil and Uruguay confirmed their interest to FIFA. On 7 June 1999, FIFA selected Brazil to host the competition, which was initially scheduled to take place in 1999. Manchester United legend Bobby Charlton, a pillar of England's victorious campaign in the 1966 FIFA World Cup, stated that the Club World Championship provided "a fantastic chance of becoming the first genuine world champions." The competition gave away US$28 million in prize money and its TV rights, worth US$40 million, were sold to 15 broadcasters across five continents. The final draw of the first Club World Championship was done on 14 October 1999 at the Copacabana Palace Hotel in Rio de Janeiro.

The inaugural competition was planned to be contested in 1999 by the continental club winners of 1998, the Intercontinental Cup winners and the host nation's national club champions, but it was postponed by one year. When it was rescheduled, the competition had eight new participants from the continental champions of 1999: Brazilian clubs Corinthians and Vasco da Gama, English side Manchester United, Mexican club Necaxa, Moroccan club Raja Casablanca, Spanish side Real Madrid, Saudi club Al-Nassr, and Australian club South Melbourne. The first goal of the competition was scored by Real Madrid's Nicolas Anelka against Al-Nassr; Real Madrid went on to win the match 3–1. The final was an all-Brazilian affair, as well as the only one which saw one side have home advantage. Vasco da Gama could not take advantage of its local support, being beaten by Corinthians 4–3 on penalties after a 0–0 draw in 90 minutes and extra time.

The second edition of the competition was planned for Spain in 2001, and would have featured 12 clubs. The draw was performed at A Coruña on 6 March 2001. However, it was cancelled on 18 May, due to a combination of factors, most importantly the collapse of FIFA's marketing partner International Sport and Leisure. The participants of the cancelled edition received US$750,000 each in compensation; the Real Federación Española de Fútbol (RFEF) also received US$1 million from FIFA. Another attempt to stage the competition in 2003, in which 17 countries were looking to be the host nation, also failed to happen. FIFA agreed with UEFA, CONMEBOL and Toyota to merge the Intercontinental Cup and Club World Championship into one event. The final Intercontinental Cup, played by representatives clubs of most developed continents in the football world, was in 2004, with a relaunched Club World Championship held in Japan in December 2005. All the winning teams of the Intercontinental Cup were regarded by worldwide mass media and football's community as de facto "world champions" until 2017 when FIFA officially (de jure) recognised all of them as official club world champions in equal status to the FIFA Club World Cup winners.

Knock-out tournaments (2005–present)

The 2005 version was shorter than the previous World Championship, reducing the problem of scheduling the tournament around the different club seasons across each continent. It contained just the six reigning continental champions, with the CONMEBOL and UEFA representatives receiving byes to the semi-finals. A new trophy was introduced replacing the Intercontinental trophy, the Toyota trophy and the trophy of 2000. The draw for the 2005 edition of the competition took place in Tokyo on 30 July 2005 at The Westin Tokyo. The 2005 edition saw São Paulo pushed to the limit by Saudi side Al-Ittihad to reach the final. In the final, one goal from Mineiro was enough to dispatch English club Liverpool; Mineiro became the first player to score in a Club World Cup final.

Internacional defeated defending World and South American champions São Paulo in the 2006 Copa Libertadores finals in order to qualify for the 2006 tournament. At the semi-finals, Internacional beat Egyptian side Al Ahly in order to meet Barcelona in the final. A late goal from Adriano Gabiru kept the trophy in Brazil. It was in 2007 when Brazilian hegemony was finally broken: AC Milan won a close match against Japan's Urawa Red Diamonds, who were pushed by over 67,000 fans at Yokohama's International Stadium, and won 1–0 to reach the final. In the final, Milan crushed Boca Juniors 4–2, in a match that saw the first player sent off in a Club World Cup final: Milan's Kakha Kaladze from Georgia in the 77th minute. Eleven minutes later, Boca Junior's Pablo Ledesma would join Kaladze as he too was sent off. The following year, Manchester United would emulate Milan by beating their semi-final opponents, Japan's Gamba Osaka, 5–3. They saw off Ecuadorian club LDU Quito 1–0 to become world champions in 2008.

United Arab Emirates successfully applied for the right to host the FIFA Club World Cup in 2009 and 2010. Barcelona dethroned World and European champions Manchester United in the 2009 UEFA Champions League Final to qualify for the 2009 Club World Cup. Barcelona beat Mexican club Atlante in the semi-finals 3–1 and met Estudiantes in the final. After a very close encounter which saw the need for extra-time, Lionel Messi scored from a header to snatch victory for Barcelona and complete an unprecedented sextuple. The 2010 edition saw the first non-European and non-South American side to reach the final: TP Mazembe from the Democratic Republic of Congo defeated Brazil's Internacional 2–0 in the semi-final to face Internazionale, who beat South Korean club Seongnam Ilhwa Chunma 3–0 to reach the final. Internazionale went on to beat Mazembe with the same scoreline to complete their quintuple.

The FIFA Club World Cup returned to Japan for the 2011 and 2012 edition. In 2011, Barcelona comfortably won their semi-final match 4–0 against Qatari club Al Sadd. In the final, Barcelona would repeat their performance against Santos; this is, to date, the largest winning margin in the final of the competition. Messi also became the first player to score in two different Club World Cup finals. The 2012 edition saw Europe's dominance come to an end as Corinthians, boasting over 30,000 travelling fans which was dubbed the "Invasão da Fiel", travelled to Japan to join Barcelona in being two-time winners of the competition. In the semi-finals, Al-Ahly managed to keep the scoreline close as Corinthians' Paolo Guerrero scored to send the Timão into their second final. Guerrero would once again come through for Corinthians as the Timão saw off English side Chelsea 1–0 in order to bring the trophy back to Brazil.

2013 and 2014 had the Club World Cup moving to Morocco. The first edition saw a Cinderella run of host team Raja Casablanca, who had to start in the play-off round and became the second African team to reach the final, after defeating Brazil's Atlético Mineiro in the semi-final. Like Mazembe, Raja also lost to the European champion, this time a 2–0 defeat to Bayern Munich. 2014 again had a decision between South America and Europe, and Real Madrid beat San Lorenzo 2–0.

The 2015 and 2016 editions once again saw Japan as hosts for the 7th and 8th time respectively in the 12th and 13th editions of the FIFA Club World Cup. The 2015 edition saw a final between River Plate and FC Barcelona. FC Barcelona lifted their third FIFA Club World Cup, with Suarez scoring two goals and Lionel Messi scoring one goal in the Final. One notable thing that occurred in the 2015 tournament was that Sanfrecce Hiroshima made it to third place, the farthest ever achieved by a Japanese club. This record would not last though, as the 2016 edition saw J1 League winners Kashima Antlers making it to the Final (outscoring rivals 7–1), against Real Madrid. A Gaku Shibasaki inspired Kashima attempted to win their first FIFA Club World Cup (a feat never done by any club outside of Europe and South America), but were denied by Real Madrid, who won 4–2 in extra time, thanks to a hat-trick by Cristiano Ronaldo.

The UAE returned to host the event in 2017 and 2018. 2017 involved the likes of Real Madrid becoming the first team in Club World Cup history to return to the tournament to defend their title. Real Madrid became the first team to successfully defend their title after defeating Grêmio in the Final, all while eliminating Al Jazira in the Semi-Finals. Al-Ain was the first Emirati team to reach the Club World Cup final, as well as the second Asian team to reach the final in the 2018 edition. Real Madrid defeated Al-Ain 4–1 in the final, to win their fourth title in the competition and to become the first team ever to win it three years in a row and four times in total in the tournament's history. Thus, Real Madrid extended their international titles to seven after winning the 2018 edition (counting their three Intercontinental Cup titles and four Club World Cup titles).

On 3 June 2019, FIFA selected Qatar as the host of both the 2019 and 2020 events. Gonzalo Belloso, the Deputy Secretary General and development director of CONMEBOL, previously said that the 2019 and 2020 editions will be held in Japan. The 2019 edition saw Liverpool defeat Flamengo to win the competition for the first time. In the 2020 edition, Bayern Munich beat Tigres UANL 1–0, completing their sextuple. The 2021 tournament was won by Chelsea, who defeated Palmeiras 2–1 after extra time for their first title.

Planned expansion
In late 2016, FIFA President Gianni Infantino suggested an expansion of the Club World Cup to 32 teams beginning in 2019 and the reschedule to June to be more balanced and more attractive to broadcasters and sponsors. In late 2017, FIFA discussed proposals to expand the competition to 24 teams and have it be played every four years by 2021, replacing the FIFA Confederations Cup.

The new tournament with 24 teams was supposed to start in 2021 and would have included all UEFA Champions League winners, UEFA Champions League runners-up, UEFA Europa League winners, and Copa Libertadores winners from the four seasons up to and including the year of the event, with the remainder qualifying from the other four confederations. Along with a new UEFA Nations League competition, revenues of $25 billion would be expected during the period from 2021 to 2033. The first tournament would have been played in China; however, the tournament was cancelled due to scheduling issues caused by the COVID-19 pandemic.

On 16 December 2022, FIFA announced an expanded tournament that would have 32 teams and start in June 2025. The International Federation of Professional Footballers and World Leagues Forum both immediately criticized the proposal.

Results

Finals

{| class="wikitable sortable" style="font-size:93%; text-align:; width:;"
|-
! rowspan=2 style= "width:;" | 
! rowspan=2 style= "width:;" | Year
! rowspan=2 style= "width:60;" |Host
! colspan=3 | First place game
! colspan=3 | Third place game
! rowspan=2 style= "width:;" | 
! rowspan=2 style= "width:;" | 
|-
! width= 170px| Winners 
! width= 70px|Score 
! width= 170px| Runners-up
! width= 170px | Third place
! width= 70px | Score
! width= 170px | Fourth place 
|-
| 
|  
| Brazil
|  Corinthians
|   
|  Vasco da Gama
|  Necaxa
|  
|  Real Madrid
| 
| 
|-
| 
| 
| Spain
| style=background:#efefef colspan=6| 
| 
|
|-
|rowspan=3| 
| 
|rowspan=3| 
|style=background:#efefef colspan=7 rowspan=3| 
|rowspan=3| 
|-
| 
|-
| 
|-
| 
| 
| Japan
|  São Paulo
| 
|  Liverpool
|  Saprissa
| 
|  Al-Ittihad
| 
|
|-
| 
|  || Japan
|  Internacional
| 
|  Barcelona
|  Al Ahly
| 
|  América
| 
| 
|-
| 
| 
| Japan
|  Milan
| 
|  Boca Juniors
|  Urawa Red Diamonds 
|  
|  Étoile du Sahel
| 
| 
|-
| 
| 
| Japan
|  Manchester United
| 
|  LDU Quito
|  Gamba Osaka
| 
|  Pachuca
| 
|
|-
| 
| 
| UAE
|  Barcelona 
| 
|  Estudiantes LP
|  Pohang Steelers 
|  
|  Atlante
| 
|  
|-
| 
| 
| UAE 
|  Internazionale
| 
|  TP Mazembe
|  Internacional
| 
|  Seongnam Ilhwa Chunma
| 
| 
|-
| 
| 
| Japan
|  Barcelona
| 
|  Santos
|  Al Sadd
|  
|  Kashiwa Reysol
| 
|
|-
|  
| 
| Japan
|  Corinthians
| 
|  Chelsea
|  Monterrey
| 
|  Al Ahly
| 
| 
|-
| 
| 
| Morocco
|  Bayern Munich
| 
|  Raja Casablanca
|  Atlético Mineiro
| 
|  Guangzhou Evergrande 
| 
| 
|-
| 
| 
| Morocco
|  Real Madrid
| 
|  San Lorenzo
|  Auckland City
|  
|  Cruz Azul
| 
| 
|-
| 
| 
| Japan
|  Barcelona
| 
|  River Plate
|  Sanfrecce Hiroshima
| 
|  Guangzhou Evergrande
| 
| 
|-
| 
| 
| Japan
|  Real Madrid
| 
|  Kashima Antlers
|  Atlético Nacional
|  
| América
| 
| 
|-
| 
| 
| UAE
|  Real Madrid| 
|  Grêmio 
|  Pachuca 
| 
|  Al-Jazira
| 
| 
|-
| 
| 
| UAE
|  Real Madrid| 
|  Al-Ain
|  River Plate 
| 
|  Kashima Antlers 
| 
| 
|-
| 
| 
| Qatar
|  Liverpool 
|  
|  Flamengo
|  Monterrey
|  
|  Al-Hilal
| 
| 
|-
| 
| 
| Qatar
|  Bayern Munich| 
|  Tigres UANL
|  Al Ahly
|  
| Palmeiras
| 
| 
|-
| 
| 
| UAE
|  Chelsea 
| 
|  Palmeiras
|  Al Ahly
| 
|  Al-Hilal
| 
| 
|-
| 
| 
| Morocco
|  Real Madrid'| 
|  Al-Hilal
|  Flamengo
| 
|  Al Ahly
| 
| 
|-
| 
| 
| Saudi Arabia
| 
| 
| 
| 
| 
| 
| 
| 
|}
Notes

 Performances by club 

 Performances by country 

 Performances by confederation 
Africa's best representatives were TP Mazembe from the Democratic Republic of the Congo and Moroccan club Raja Casablanca, which finished second in 2010 and 2013, respectively. Asia's best representatives were Kashima Antlers from Japan, Al-Ain from the United Arab Emirates and Al-Hilal from Saudi Arabia, finishing second in 2016, 2018 and 2022, respectively. North America's best result was Mexican team Tigres UANL, which earned a second-place finish in 2020. These six clubs are the only sides from outside Europe and South America to reach the final.

Auckland City from New Zealand earned third place in 2014, the only time to date that an Oceanian team reached the semi-finals of the tournament.

Format and rules

As of 2022, most teams qualify to the FIFA Club World Cup by winning their continental competitions, be it the AFC Champions League, CAF Champions League, CONCACAF Champions League, Copa Libertadores, OFC Champions League or UEFA Champions League. Aside from these, the host nation's national league champions qualify as well.

The maiden edition of this competition was separated into two rounds. The eight participants were split into two groups of four teams. The winner of each group met in the final while the runners-up played for third place. The competition changed its format during the 2005 relaunch into a single-elimination tournament in which teams play each other in one-off matches, with extra time and penalty shoot-outs used to decide the winner if necessary. It featured six clubs competing over a two-week period. There were three stages: the quarter-final round, the semi-final round and the final. The quarter-final stage pitted the Oceanian Champions League winners, the African Champions League winners, the Asian Champions League winners and the North American Champions League winners against each other. Afterwards, the winners of those games would go on to the semi-finals to play the European Champions League winners and South America's Copa Libertadores winners. The victors of each semi-final would play go on to play in the final.

With the introduction of this format, a fifth place match and a spot for the host nation's national league champions were added. There are now four stages: the play-off round, the quarter-final round, the semi-final round and the final. The first stage pits the host nation's national league champions against the Oceanian Champions League winners. The winner of that stage would go on the quarter-finals to join the African Champions League winners, the AFC Champions League winners and the CONCACAF Champions League winners. The winners of those games would go on to the semi-finals to play the UEFA Champions League winners and South America's Copa Libertadores winners. The winners of each semi-final play each other in the final.

Starting from 2022, the match for fifth place is no longer played.

Trophy

The trophy used during the inaugural competition was called the FIFA Club World Championship Cup. The original laurel was created by Sawaya & Moroni, an Italian designer company that produces contemporary designs with cultural backgrounds and design concepts. The designing firm is based in Milan. The trophy had a base of two pedestals which had four rectangular pillars. Two of the four pillars had inscriptions on them; one contained the phrase, "FIFA Club World Championship" imprinted across. The other had the letters "FIFA" inscribed on it. On top, a football based on the 1998 FIFA World Cup ball, the Adidas Tricolore, can be seen. The production costs of the laurel was US$25,000. It was presented for the first time at Sheraton Hotels and Resorts in Rio de Janeiro on 4 January 2000.

The tournament, in its present format, shares its name with the current trophy, also called the FIFA Club World Cup or simply la Copa'', which is awarded to the FIFA Club World Cup winner. It was unveiled at Tokyo on 30 July 2005 during the draw of that year's edition of the competition. The laurel was designed in 2005 in Birmingham, United Kingdom, at Thomas Fattorini Ltd, by English designer Jane Powell, alongside her assistant Dawn Forbes, at the behest of FIFA. Its base and widest points are also measured at exactly . It is made out of a combination of brass, copper, sterling silver, gilding metal, aluminium, chrome and rhodium. The trophy itself is gold plated.

The design, according to FIFA, shows six staggered pillars, representing the six participating teams from the respective six confederations, and one separate metal structure referencing the winner of the competition. They hold up a globe in the shape of a football – a consistent feature in almost all of FIFA's trophies. The golden pedestal has the phrase, "FIFA Club World Cup", imprinted at the bottom.

Awards

At the end of each Club World Cup, awards are presented to the players and teams for accomplishments other than their final team positions in the tournament. There are currently three awards:

The Golden Ball for the best player, determined by a vote of media members, who is also awarded the Alibaba Cloud Award (the presenting sponsor of the FIFA Club World Cup); the Silver Ball and the Bronze Ball are awarded to the players finishing second and third in the voting respectively.
The Player of the Match (formerly known as the "Man of the Match") for the best performing player in each tournament match. It was first awarded in 2013.
The FIFA Fair Play Trophy for the team with the best fair play record, according to the points system and criteria established by the FIFA Fair Play Committee.

The winners of the competition are also entitled to receive the FIFA Champions Badge; it features an image of the trophy, which the reigning champion is entitled to display on its first-team kit only, up until and including, the final of the next championship. The first edition of the badge was presented to Milan, the winners of the 2007 final. All four previous champions were allowed to wear the badge until the 2008 final, where Manchester United gained the sole right to wear the badge by winning the trophy.

Each tournament's top three teams receives a set of gold, silver or bronze medals to distribute to their players.

Prize money

The 2000 FIFA Club World Championship was the inaugural edition of this competition; it provided US$28 million in prize money for its participants. The prize money received by the clubs participating was divided into fixed payments based on participation and results. Clubs finishing the tournament from fifth to eighth place received US$2.5 million. The club who would eventually finish in fourth place received US$3 million while the third-place team received US$4 million. The runner-up earned US$5 million while the eventual champions would gain US$6 million.

The relaunch of the tournament in 2005 FIFA Club World Championship saw different amounts of prize money given and some changes in the criteria of receiving certain amounts. The total amount of prize money given dropped to US$16 million. The winners received US$5 million and the runners-up US$4 million, with $2.5 million for third place, US$2 million for fourth, US$1.5 million for fifth and US$1 million for sixth.

For the 2007 FIFA Club World Cup, a play-off match between the OFC champions and the host-nation champions for entry into the quarter-final stage was introduced in order to increase home interest in the tournament. The reintroduction of the match for fifth place for the 2008 competition also prompted an increase in prize money by US$500,000 to a total of US$16.5 million.

Sponsorship
Like the FIFA World Cup, the FIFA Club World Cup is sponsored by a group of multinational corporations. Toyota Motor Corporation, a Japanese multinational automaker headquartered in Toyota, Aichi, was the Presenting Partner of the FIFA Club World Cup until its sponsorship agreement expired at the end of December 2014 and was not renewed. Because Toyota was an automobile manufacturer and the main sponsor of the tournament, Hyundai-Kia's status as a FIFA partner was not active with respect to the Club World Cup prior to 2015. However, the other FIFA partners – Adidas, Coca-Cola and Visa – retained full sponsorship rights. In 2015, Alibaba Group signed an eight-year contract to become the Presenting Partner of the competition.

The inaugural competition had six event sponsors: Fujifilm, Hyundai, JVC, McDonald's, Budweiser and MasterCard.

Individual clubs may wear jerseys with advertising, even if such sponsors conflict with those of the FIFA Club World Cup. However, only one main sponsor is permitted per jersey in addition to that of the kit manufacturer.

Records and statistics

Toni Kroos has won the FIFA Club World Cup six times, which is the record for the most by any player. Cristiano Ronaldo holds the record of being the overall top goalscorer in FIFA Club World Cup history with seven goals. Hussein El Shahat is the player with the most appearances in the competition, with twelve.

Real Madrid have won the FIFA Club World Cup a record five times. They also have the most wins (12) and most total goals scored in the competition (40). Auckland City have participated in the most different tournaments (10), while Al Ahly have played the most matches in the competition (22).

Official songs 
Like most international football tournaments, the FIFA Club World Cup has featured official songs for each tournament since 2005. Unlike most larger tournaments, such as the FIFA World Cup, the songs consist mainly of J-pop, as most of the FIFA Club World Cups were held in Japan.

Reception 
Since its inception in 2000, the competition, despite its name and the contestants' achievements, has received differing reception. In most of Europe it struggles to find broad media attention compared to the UEFA Champions League and commonly lacks recognition as a high-ranking contest. In South America, however, it is widely considered the highest point in the career of a footballer, coach and/or team at international club level. In Brazil and Argentina, the tournament is seen as a continuity of the Intercontinental Cup.

The competition is also criticised, mainly by the European press and fans among others, for its format, which favours the UEFA and CONMEBOL teams, since their representatives start in the semi-finals and can only meet each other in the final match. The opening up of the global market in football has changed the balance. Nowadays, the best South Americans are usually playing for the European teams. FIFA's decision to choose the competition's host based on economic deals rather than their footballing merit, such as Qatar, has also been criticised. Additionally, the economic benefits to the winning team are considered inferior to any Super Cup prizes.

See also
 List of association football competitions
 List of world champion football clubs
 Intercontinental Cup

References

Further reading

External links

 

 
Club World Cup
Club World Cup
Recurring sporting events established in 2000
December sporting events